The Takla Range is a small subrange of the Skeena Mountains of the Interior Mountains, bounded by Takla Lake and Northwest Arm in northern British Columbia, Canada.

Further reading
 Paul Schiarizza and Don MacIntyre, EOLOGY OF THE BABINE LAKE - TAKLA LAKE AREA, CENTRAL BRITISH COLUMBIA, P 44

References

Skeena Mountains